A Woman Has Fallen (Italian: È caduta una donna) is a 1941 Italian drama film directed by Alfredo Guarini and starring Isa Miranda, Rossano Brazzi, and Claudio Gora.

The film's sets were designed by the art directors Gustav Abel, Paolo Reni, and Amleto Bonetti.

Cast
Isa Miranda: Dina
Rossano Brazzi: Dottor Roberto Frassi
Vittorina Benvenuti: Teresa, la governante
Anita Farra: sig.ra Cattaneo
Jone Frigerio: l'anziana madre di Giovanni 
Olga Solbelli: la direttrice della casa di mode
Claudio Gora: Mario 
Luigi Pavese: Fabbri
Nando Tamberlani: un amico di Nora
Luigi Zerbinati: Montarone 
Nietta Zocchi: una cliente della casa di mode 
Liana Del Balzo: una vicina di casa
Diana Dei: l'infermiera del reparto maternità

References

Bibliography

External links

1941 films
1941 drama films
Italian drama films
1940s Italian-language films
Films directed by Alfredo Guarini
Italian black-and-white films
1940s Italian films